The siege of Acapulco was a battle of the War of Mexican Independence that occurred on 12 April 1813 at Acapulco de Juárez. The battle was fought between the royalist forces loyal to the Spanish crown, commanded by Pedro Antonio Vélez, and the Mexican rebels fighting for independence from the Spanish Empire, commanded by José María Morelos. The prestigious battle resulted in a victory for the Mexican rebels.

The battle
After a series of skirmishes leading up to the actual siege, Mexican rebel forces were finally able to besiege the city and take the plaza of Acapulco on 12 April 1813. The Spanish forces took refuge in the Fuerte de San Diego where they were able to continue to resist the insurgent attacks until August of the same year when a truce was signed between José María Morelos and Pedro Antonio Vélez. The rebel victory was strategically important because the port was one of the largest and most important to the strategic objectives laid out by Morelos at the start of the campaign.

References

Works cited

Acapulco
Conflicts in 1813
Acapulco
History of Guerrero
Acapulco
Acapulco
1813 in New Spain
April 1813 events